Florimont-Gaumier is a commune in the Dordogne department in Nouvelle-Aquitaine in southwestern France.

Geography
The river Céou forms part of the commune's northern border.

Population

See also
Communes of the Dordogne department

References

Communes of Dordogne